Tarragona is a station in the Barcelona Metro network in the Sants-Montjuïc district of Barcelona. It is served by line L3 (green line).

The station is located under Carrer de Tarragona between Carrer de València and Carrer d'Aragó, not far from Barcelona Sants railway station. Station entrances are situated at the junctions of the Carrer de Tarragona with Carrer de València, Carrer d'Aragó, Carrer de l'Elisi and Carrer de Sant Nicolau. In the vestibule served by the southern entrance is the artwork Tres Boles by José Luis Carcedo Vidal. At the lower level, the station has two tracks served by two side platforms.

The station opened in 1975, along with the other stations of the section of L3 between Paral·lel and Sants Estació stations. This section was originally operated separately from L3, and known as L3b, until the two sections were joined in 1982.

References

External links
 

Barcelona Metro line 3 stations
Railway stations in Spain opened in 1975
Transport in Sants-Montjuïc